A destination marketing organization (DMO) is an organisation which promotes a location as an attractive travel destination. DMOs are known as tourist boards, tourism authorities or "Convention and Visitors Bureaux". They primarily exist to provide information to leisure travellers. Additionally, where a suitable infrastructure exists, they encourage event organisers to choose their location for meetings, incentives, conferences, and exhibitions, collectively abbreviated as MICE.
 
DMOs are generally tied to the local government infrastructure, often with supporting funds being generated by specific taxes, such as hotel taxes, membership fees, and sometimes government subsidies. However, in many cases, the observed decline in tourism following cutbacks to public-sector expenditures has motivated the tourism industry to create a private sector coalition in order to provide the functions of a DMO.

References

Tourism marketing
Marketing organizations
Services marketing